Thoppi is a 2015 Indian Tamil language drama film directed by Youreka and starring Murali Ram, Raksha Raj and G. M. Kumar. The film is about a man with a criminal background who aspires to be a cop.

Cast 
Murali Ram as Sithan
Raksha Raj
G. M. Kumar as Suruttu Saamy
Aruldoss

Production 
Television anchor Murali Ram, who played supporting roles in a few films, made his lead debut with this film. The film was shot in Theni and Korangani.

Soundtrack 
US-based Ramprasad Sundar composed the songs for the film.

Reception 
During release, the film's director complained that the producer cut scenes considerably in the second half without his knowledge.

M. Suganth of The Times of India opined that "The offbeat humour comes across well, but the film is modestly engaging". Malini Mannath of The New Indian Express wrote that "But Thoppi, despite the glitches, is refreshing and is one of the better films to have come out in recent times". A critic from Maalai Malar praised the performances of the cast and the cinematography. A critic from Dinamalar noted that the film would make fans happy.

References

External links